1965 Emperor's Cup Final was the 45th final of the Emperor's Cup competition. The final was played at Komazawa Olympic Park Stadium in Tokyo on January 16, 1966. Toyo Industries won the championship.

Overview
Toyo Industries won their 1st title, by defeating defending champion Yawata Steel 3–2.

Match details

See also
1965 Emperor's Cup

References

Emperor's Cup
Emperor's Cup Final
Emperor's Cup Final
Emperor's Cup Final
Sanfrecce Hiroshima matches